Match Made In Heaven is an American reality television dating game show, that premiered on WE tv on February 4, 2015. It starred Shawn Bullard, who chose Jade as the winner.
Season 2 premiered on May 19, 2016 with a new bachelor, Stevie Baggs. Sherri Shepherd hosted season 2. Stevie chose Christina as the winner.

Overview

Format
This reality show features an African-American male in search of a wife (à la The Bachelor on ABC). Instead of a rose, the women are sent text messages asking them to stay, leave, or meet Shawn at the bridge for further discussion of their plight.

In season one, 24 women competed for bachelor Shawn Bullard, a successful businessman, with the help of Pastor Ken Johnson. The women competed in challenges to win dates with Shawn, while the other women were tempted to interfere with the date. At the end, Shawn had chosen Jade.

References

2010s American game shows
2015 American television series debuts
2010s American reality television series
2016 American television series endings
American dating and relationship reality television series